A list of films produced in the Tamil film industry in India in 1996 by release date.

Movies

Awards

Notable deaths 
Silk Smitha - South Indian Actress.
V. N. Janaki - South Indian Actress and Former Chief Minister of Tamil Nadu.

References

1996
Films, Tamil
Lists of 1996 films by country or language
1990s Tamil-language films